The Glory River (Nahar al-Aaz), Glory Canal  or Prosperity Canal is a shallow canal in Iraq about two kilometers wide built by Saddam Hussein in 1993 to redirect water flowing from the Tigris river into the Euphrates, near their confluence at the Shatt al-Arab. It helped cause an environmental and humanitarian disaster since it diverted natural water flow from the Central Marshes and effectively converted much of the wetlands into a desert. 

After the First Gulf War, Saddam Hussein aggressively revived a program to divert the flow of the Tigris and the Euphrates rivers away from the marshes in retribution for a failed Shia uprising in 1991. Draining of the Mesopotamian Marshes directly affected the Marsh Arabs, forcing them to abandon the settlements in the region. Since the overthrow of Hussein in the 2003 invasion of Iraq, the marshland ecoregion has recovered substantially with the breaching of dikes by local communities.

See also
 Dancon/Irak
 Marsh Arabs
 Tigris-Euphrates river system
 Environmental issues in Iraq

References

Canals in Iraq
Human rights abuses in Iraq
Shatt al-Arab basin
Wetlands of Iraq
Tigris River
Environmental issues in Iraq
Canals opened in 1993